This article details the qualifying phase for rowing at the 2020 Summer Olympics . The majority of the spots were awarded to the National Olympic Committees, not to specific athletes, at the 2019 World Rowing Championships, held in Ottensheim, Austria from 25 August to 1 September 2019. At the World Championships countries qualify boats rather than crews and can make crew changes for the Olympic regatta for qualified boats. Further berths are distributed to the nations at four continental qualifying regattas in Asia and Oceania, Africa, Latin America, and Europe.  The last berths were distributed at the Final Olympic Qualification Regatta held in Lucerne, Switzerland 15–16 May 2021.

All qualifying NOCs are limited to one berth per event, and only NOCs with fewer than two berths from the World Championships may compete in the continental qualifying regattas. Host nation Japan will be automatically granted a berth each in the men's and women's single sculls, in case the nation fails to qualify for any rowing event at the various regattas.

Timeline

Qualification summary

Men's events

Men's single sculls

Men's double sculls

Men's lightweight double sculls

Men's quadruple sculls

Men's coxless pair

Men's coxless four

Men's eight

Women's events

Women's single sculls

Women's double sculls

Women's lightweight double sculls

Women's quadruple sculls

Women's coxless pair

Women's coxless four

Women's eight

References

Notes

Qualification
Qualification for the 2020 Summer Olympics
Impact of the COVID-19 pandemic on the 2020 Summer Olympics